Museum is a ghost town in Sheridan County, Kansas, United States.

History
Museum was issued a post office in 1882. The post office was discontinued in 1898.

References

Further reading

External links
 Sheridan County maps: Current, Historic, KDOT

Former populated places in Sheridan County, Kansas
Former populated places in Kansas